Akshay Homraj (born 30 April 1996) is a Guyanese-born American cricketer. In November 2019, he was named in the United States' squad for the 2019–20 Regional Super50 tournament. He made his List A debut on 9 November 2019, for the United States in the Regional Super50 tournament.

In December 2019, he was named in the United States' One Day International (ODI) squad for the 2019 United Arab Emirates Tri-Nation Series. He made his ODI debut for the United States, against the United Arab Emirates on 8 December 2019. In June 2021, he was selected to take part in the Minor League Cricket tournament in the United States following the players' draft.

References

External links
 

1996 births
Living people
Indo-Guyanese people
American cricketers
United States One Day International cricketers
Guyanese emigrants to the United States
American people of Indo-Guyanese descent
American sportspeople of Guyanese descent
American sportspeople of Indian descent